The Probinsyano Ako Party-List is a political organization which has party-list representation in the House of Representatives of the Philippines.

They participated in the 2019 Philippine elections, where they secured two seats in the House of Representatives. The seats were filled by Rudys Fariñas and Lira Fuster-Fariñas who are members of the Fariñas political family of Ilocos Norte.

Representation in the Congress

References

Party-lists represented in the House of Representatives of the Philippines